Stieltjeskanaal is a canal and village in the Netherlands and it is part of the Coevorden municipality in Drenthe.

History 
On 11 April 1880, construction of the canal started and was finished in November 1884. It has been named after . In 1899, a village appeared along the canal. It is a linear settlement and is considered a twin village of Dalerveen.

References 

Coevorden
Populated places in Drenthe
Canals in the Netherlands
Canals opened in 1884
CStieltjes